El intruso ("the Intruder") is a 1999 Colombian film that was produced, written, directed by, and starred Guillermo Álvarez. The plot revolves around a couple who move to a small village, and are then investigated after the discovery of the body of the woman's lover.

Cast

Luz Ángela Bermúdez - Lucila 
Germán Torres Rey - Rumaldo 
Guillermo Álvarez - Inspector

Awards

Bogotá Film Festival (1999) 

Honorable Mention for Guillermo Álvarez
Nominated for the Golden Precolumbian Circle Best Colombian Film

External links 
 

1999 films
Colombian crime drama films
1990s Spanish-language films
1999 crime drama films
Films set in Colombia